Dynamics is the second studio album by American synthpop duo Holy Ghost!. It was released on September 3, 2013 by DFA Records. The album was preceded by the single "Dumb Disco Ideas" on May 14, 2013. The album's cover features the image "Strong in Love" by American painter and sculptor Robert Longo.

Track listing

Personnel
Credits adapted from the liner notes of Dynamics.

Holy Ghost!
 Holy Ghost! – engineering, mixing, production
 Alex Frankel – vocals (all tracks); CS-80 (1, 2, 5, 8–11); DX7 (1, 8, 10); clavinet (2); Roland VP-330 (2, 8, 9); Omnichord, Polyensemble (3); piano (3, 5); percussion (4, 5); OB-8, Taurus, TR-66 (5); Emulator (5, 9); D-50, MS-20 (6, 7); Wurlitzer (8); Jupiter-8, Rhodes (8, 10); Paraphonic (9); Prophet-5 (10)
 Nicholas Millhiser – CS-60, piano, SH-101 (1); guitar (1–3, 6–9, 11); modular synthesizer (1, 2, 9, 10); DX7 (1, 4, 5); Taurus (1, 6, 7); CS-80 (1–7, 9, 11); 808 (1, 10); percussion (2); drums (2–8, 11); bass (2, 3, 6–8); RS-09, Wurlitzer (3); Jupiter-8 (3, 5, 9, 11); Rogue (4); Emulator (5, 11); Rhodes (6, 7); Mellotron (8, 9); MG-1, Prophet '08 (8, 11); LM-1 (9, 10)

Additional personnel
 Greg Calbi – mastering
 John Furrisky – violin (8)
 Ben Grubin – backing vocals (4)
 Kosuke Kasza – guitar (5, 10)
 Sheila Lamont – cello (8)
 Robert Longo – cover image
 Chris Maher – backing vocals (1, 2, 4)
 Rachael Millkey – additional art direction, production design
 Alan Palomo – backing vocals (11)
 Kelley Polar – viola (8)
 Surahn Sidhu – backing vocals (6, 7)
 Matt Thornley – musical assistance
 Michael Vadino – art direction, design
 Nancy Whang – backing vocals (2–4, 8, 9)
 Chris Zane – mixing

Charts

Release history

References

2013 albums
DFA Records albums
Holy Ghost! albums